Methylsilane is the organosilicon compound with the formula . It is a colorless gas that ignites in air.  It can be prepared by reduction of methyltrichlorosilane with lithium aluminium hydride.  It has been investigated as a precursor to silicon carbide.

Methylsilane has been the subject of extensive theoretical analysis.

References

Carbosilanes